1 California is a trolleybus line operated by the San Francisco Municipal Railway (Muni). It provides service between the Richmond District and Financial District along California Street.

Route description
From the outbound terminal at Geary Boulevard and 33rd Avenue, buses loop around the block to run north on 32nd Avenue. The route then operates on California Street between 32nd and Steiner. The line continues eastward a block further north on Sacramento Street. Between Gough and the terminal at Clay and Drumm, the line runs with the direction of the one-way streets Sacramento (westbound) and Clay (eastbound).

1X / 1AX / 1BX California Express services
The outbound segment of the express lines match that of the local service. The 1AX California 'A' Express running nonstop between 8th Avenue and Montgomery Street and the 1BX California 'B' Express terminates at 6th Avenue and runs express after Fillmore Street. The eastern end of the line terminates adjacent to Embarcadero station and runs via an overlapping loop on one-way streets.

During the COVID-19 pandemic, 1AX and 1BX service was suspended. Express service on California Street resumed with the 1X line on February 21, 2023. The 1X terminates at Geary and 33rd Avenue and runs express east of Arguello Boulevard. The line also serves an additional terminus near the Embarcadero Center in evening peak hours.

History
Market Street Railway operated the 1 California streetcar between the Ferry Building and the Sunset on a route primarily via Sutter Street, California Street, Clement Street, and Geary Street.

The C Geary–California streetcar route was the third Muni line to open in 1913. It ran from ran from the Ferry Building along Market Street, Geary, 2nd Avenue, Cornwall, and California to 33rd Avenue. The route was cut short in 1950 to California and 2nd Avenue with the opening of the 1 California bus line, and was removed along with the B Geary on December 29, 1956.

The 1 California and 55 Sacramento were combined to form the current 1 California line on January 27, 1982.

References

Bibliography

External links

1 California — via SFMTA

San Francisco Municipal Railway trolleybus routes